Chinyalisaur is a small town and tehsil headquarters in the Uttarkashi district of the Indian state of Uttarakhand.

Geography 
Chinyalisaur is a semi-urban settlement. It is named after a nearby village called Chinyali. 'Saur' is the Garhrwali word for "plain" area.  Chinyalisaur is located along the pilgrimage route to Gangotri. It is surrounded by small mountains and sits on the banks of the river Bhagirathi. The Chinyali Saur was the native land of Bisht Thakurs. The Nagraja temple is the oldest temple here. The patti there had been named after the Mansabdars Bisht Thakurs as Bishtpati. This place was known for his long plain lands and farming which were the beauty of this place but after the all-weather road was built the farming and beauty of the chinyalisaur vanished because the cows and bulls are destroying the farming and eating the crops which the people were growing this caused chinyalisaur a major loss of their farming lands.

It is around 70 kilometres from Chamba, 34 kilometers from Uttarkashi and 100km from capital Dehradun. 

The Arch Bridge, Shri Krishna Trilokhi Nath Nagraja Mandir, Balaji Mandir Dharashu, Ganga Beach, Trek To Nagraja Dhar, etc are locations to visit and enjoy with friends and family.

A lake formed by the Tehri power project covers some part of this town. The arch bridge over the lake is an attraction point. 

Krishi Vigyan Kendra is located there.

Education 
The town has one intermediate college , one degree college, ITI, a polytechnic college and various private educational schools , One of the famous private school among there is MARY MATA SCHOOL (Convent of Jesus and Marry). It is a developing educational hub. GIC Inter College completed 50 years of operation in 2015.

Demographics 
The population of the city is about 50,000. The majority of the population speak Garhwali.

Economy 
The main occupation is agriculture, government, and business. The headquarters of Maneri Bhali Hydroelectric Project are there.

Transport 
The town is served by Chinyalisaur Airport which is used by the Indian Air Force as an Advanced Landing Ground.

References 

Cities and towns in Uttarkashi district